Xuân Sơn National Park is a national park of Tân Sơn District, Phú Thọ Province, Vietnam. It was established on August 9, 1986 as a nature reserve, and it covers an area of 150.48 square kilometres.

The park lies at the extreme south-eastern extent of the Hoang Lien Mountains, 45 kilometres south-west of the confluence of the Red River and Black Rivers.

References

External links
Official site

National parks of Vietnam
Protected areas established in 1986
Geography of Phú Thọ province
1986 establishments in Vietnam